The 1979 Daihatsu Challenge was a women's singles tennis tournament played on indoor carpet courts at the Brighton Centre in Brighton in England. The event was part of the AAA category of the 1979 Colgate Series. It was the second edition of the tournament and was held from 20 November through 25 November 1979. First-seeded Martina Navratilova won the singles title and earned $20,000 first-prize money.

Finals

Singles
 Martina Navratilova defeated  Chris Evert 6–3, 6–3
It was Navratilova's 10th singles title of the year and the 34th of her career.

Doubles
 Ann Kiyomura /  Anne Smith defeated  Ilana Kloss /  Laura duPont 6–2, 6–1

Prize money

Notes

References

External links
 International Tennis Federation (ITF) tournament event details
 Women's Tennis Association (WTA) tournament event details

Daihatsu Challenge
1979 in English tennis
Brighton International
Daihatsu Challenge
Daihatsu Challenge